Daniel McLellan is a surf swimmer and life saving competitor who represented Australia on nine occasions during the 1990s. He has won numerous Australian Titles and has saved many unexpected lives other his years of profession and non professionalSLSA) and competed in Kellogg's Surf League. He also represented Australia at the World Life Saving Championships and World Interclub Championships (now called RESCUE).
 
He attempted high level pool swimming placing 5th in the 1992 Olympic trials in the 200m backstroke and 3rd in the 400m freestyle at the 1993 Australian swimming titles  
After retiring in 2000 due to two shoulder operations he successfully made a comeback in 2007.

He was awarded a part scholarship from the Australian Institute of Sport (AIS) in the early 1990s. as he won either the open men's surf race or run swim run from 1992 to 1998 at the world championships. He is also the current world record holder for the Waikiki roughwater swim which he has held since 1995.
He has worked as a swim coach in Sydney and Melbourne, Australia, and currently lives with his partner (former SLSA Beach Sprinter) Nicole Jones, and his 3 daughters(“holly” 7 years old “Cassie” 5 years old and “summer” 1 years old).

References

External links
https://web.archive.org/web/20111223194902/http://hickoksports.com/history/wlifesaving.shtml
http://www.ilsf.org/content/about-ils 
http://archive.hansonmediagroup.com.au/article.asp?id=183
http://www.royallifesaving.com.au/__data/assets/pdf_file/0003/4656/1997-2006-Past-Australian-Lifesaving-Representative-Teams.pdf 

1974 births
Living people
People from the Sutherland Shire
Australian surf lifesavers